Kanak Peak is a conspicuous ice-free peak,  high, standing  northwest of Mount Gniewek and north of the head of Carlyon Glacier in the Cook Mountains of Antarctica.

See also
Murayama Crests, a group of peaks located 4 nautical miles (7 km) north-northeast of Kanak Peak

References

External links

Mountains of Oates Land